A number of vessels of the People's Liberation Army Navy have borne the name Guangzhou, after the capital Guangzhou.

 , a Type 051 destroyer, in service in 1973–1978.
 , a Type 052B destroyer, in service since 2004.

References 

People's Liberation Army Navy ship names